Maiwand is a village in Afghanistan within the Maywand District of Kandahar Province. It is located 50 miles northwest of Kandahar, on the main Kandahar–Lashkargah road.

The area is irrigated by the Helmand and Arghandab Valley Authority.

Maiwand is the birthplace of the 13th-century Sufi saint Lal Shahbaz Qalandar.

The village is notable for the Battle of Maiwand, which took place on July 27, 1880, during the Second Anglo-Afghan War. Ayub Khan together with Malalai Anaa defeated a British brigade under General Burrows. The British commemorated the battle with the Maiwand Lion sculpture at Forbury Gardens in England.

References

Populated places in Kandahar Province